Statistics of Belgian League in season 1988–89.

Overview

It was contested by 18 teams, and KV Mechelen won the championship, while R.W.D. Molenbeek & K.R.C. Genk were relegated.

League standings

Results

Topscorers

References

Belgian Pro League seasons
Belgian
1